Disporum megalanthum is a deciduous rhizomatous perennial plant in the family Colchicaceae.

Description
Height: Reaches up to 60 cm at maturity.
Leaves: Leaves are deciduous. When present, they are glossy, bright green, and alternately arranged.
Stems: Arching stems.
Flowers: Nodding, bell-shaped white to creamy white flowers are borne in spring and summer.
Fruit: Fruits are present in autumn, and are blue-black in colour.

Range and distribution
Native to central China.

Habitat and cultivation
A woodland plant, D. megalanthum prefers a cool, partially shaded area with rich, neutral to acidic soil.

Best propagated by seed or from cuttings. Protect young growth from terrestrial molluscs, such as slugs and snails.

References

megalanthum
Flora of China